Ōpōtiki College is a state secondary school located in Ōpōtiki, in the Bay of Plenty, North Island, New Zealand.

History 
The first secondary schooling available in Ōpōtiki was at the Opotiki District High School, which was established in 1922.
The name was changed in 1953 when Opotiki College opened as a separate secondary school (on its present site).

When Opotiki College came into being in 1953, a new crest was decided on.  At the top is a burning lamp.  Underneath is a cogged wheel and key.  The fern and the mere were added later.

The first motto was in Latin – ; “as the mind is, so is the man”.  This was later changed to te reo Māori – ; meaning “The mind is the measure of the man”.

A new logo has recently been developed that has at its centre the Koru.

Kura Ki Uta
The school marae (Maori communal space) was opened in 1981, complete with a dedicated meeting house or wharenui, given the name . The school  (Māori Performing Arts team) has taken this name too. The  building burned down accidentally in 2014. The reconstructed  was rededicated in 2016. The photographs of the House Leaders that had been on display in the original  were saved from the fire, but the original tukutuku panels (latticework used to decorate meeting houses) were tragically lost. The carvings on the outside were restored; the original carvings from 1981 had already been replaced. The new  {front facing barge boards} represent the local tribes (iwi), Whakatōhea, Tūhoe, Ngāitai and Te Whānau-ā-Apanui. The twelve heavens and ten Atua (gods) are represented on each sidearm and the centre piece, representative of Io, the Supreme being , has representations of the three baskets (kete) of knowledge in Maori tradition (and ), the influence of the Church and the influence of Maoridom. 
School functions are held on the marae ātea, the open space in front of the meeting house, including formal powhiri (Maori welcoming ceremony) for guests, orientation for new students and celebrations of student successes.

School houses
With remarkable inclusivity the traditional school house names cover a diverse range of representatives, 
some of New Zealand's foremost representatives in their domains- sports, academic, science, literature, politicians, Ngati Porou, rainbow, Nobel prize winner, Victoria Cross winner.  
Freyberg House, named for Lieutenant General Bernard Freyberg  
Ngata House, named for Sir Āpirana Ngata 
Mansfield House, named for Katherine Mansfield 
Rutherford House, named for Lord Ernest Rutherford

Notable people
Dylan "DJ" Collier, Olympian (2021, Sevens), NZ Sevens, 2018 Commonwealth Games Gold Medalist
Luka Connor, Black Fern
Exia Shelford, Black Fern
Sam Henwood, Māori All Black
Murray Ken Hudson recipient of the George Cross
James Rolleston, actor
Frank Shelford, All Black, Māori All Black
Nikki Slade Robinson, author
Leanne Walker, Olympian, (Basketball) and NZ touch
William Walker, Māori All Black
Marilynn Webb, artist

References

Secondary schools in the Bay of Plenty Region
Ōpōtiki